Jean-François David (born April 29, 1982) is a Canadian professional ice hockey player who is currently an unrestricted free agent. He previously has served as an assistant coach with the Cape Breton Screaming Eagles of the Quebec Major Junior Hockey League.

Playing career
Born in Blainville, Quebec, David played junior hockey in the Quebec Major Junior Hockey League for the Shawinigan Cataractes.  After four seasons with the team, he briefly turned pro in 2002, playing eleven games in the ECHL for the Trenton Titans and six games in the AHL for the Bridgeport Sound Tigers before returning to the QMJHL for the Baie-Comeau Drakkar.

He played his first full pro season during 2003–04, playing in the Central Hockey League for the Laredo Bucks where he won the Ray Miron President's Cup, the CHL championship trophy.  In 2004, he signed for the Danbury Thrashers of the United Hockey League, scoring 41 points in 78 league games.  He also played 2 games in the AHL for the Hershey Bears.  In 2005, David played 16 games for the ECHL's South Carolina Stingrays before moving to Germany to play for 2nd Bundesliga side the Essen Moskitos. In 2006, he returned to the ECHL for the Texas Wildcatters.  He scored 23 points in 19 games before moving back to the AHL, playing one game for the Manitoba Moose before finishing the season with the Binghamton Senators.

In 2007, David returned to Europe, signing for Austrian side Black Wings Linz.  In 2008, David moved to France and signed with Dragons de Rouen.  In 2009 David returned to North American and began the 2009–10 season with Elmira Jackals in the ECHL playing 20 games registering a goal and five assists along with 10 PIMs, before joining the Springfield Falcons.  He then split the 2010-11 season in the ECHL for the Bakersfield Condors and then Florida Everblades before returning to France for Ducs d'Angers. After two years off David joined his hometown Trois-Rivieres Blizzard CNS of the minor-professional Ligue Nord-Americaine de Hockey, where he put up over a point per game in his first season with the team.

On November 2, 2021, David returned once more to the professional circuit after 5 seasons, agreeing again to a contract with his hometown team, this time the Trois-Rivières Lions of the ECHL, in their inaugural season. David, however, was released from Trois-Rivieres on November 11, 2021 having played three games.

Coaching
David announced his retirement as a player on June 4, 2012 and was hired as an assistant coach of the QMJHL's Cape Breton Screaming Eagles. With the Screaming Eagles, David worked with the team's defencemen. David left the team after one season, citing a desire to be closer to his family in Quebec. David experienced three years in the QMJHL as an assistant with the Screaming Eagles, Titans and Tigres.

Career statistics

References

External links
 

1982 births
Baie-Comeau Drakkar players
Bakersfield Condors (1998–2015) players
Binghamton Senators players
Bridgeport Sound Tigers players
Canadian ice hockey defencemen
Danbury Trashers players
Ducs d'Angers players
EHC Black Wings Linz players
Elmira Jackals (ECHL) players
Essen Mosquitoes players
Florida Everblades players
Hershey Bears players
Ice hockey people from Quebec
Laredo Bucks players
Living people
Manitoba Moose players
Rouen HE 76 players
Shawinigan Cataractes players
South Carolina Stingrays players
Springfield Falcons players
Texas Wildcatters players
Trenton Titans players
Trois-Rivières Lions players
People from Blainville, Quebec
Canadian expatriate ice hockey players in Austria
Canadian expatriate ice hockey players in France
Canadian expatriate ice hockey players in Germany
Canadian expatriate ice hockey players in the United States